Established in 1889, the Scottish Mountaineering Club is a club for climbing and mountaineering in Scotland.

History
The Scottish Mountaineering Club (SMC) was formed in 1889 as Scotland’s national club and the initial membership of a hundred was very much a cross section of the ‘great and the good’ of Scottish society, many of whom had an interest in mountains and mountaineering, without necessarily actually being mountaineers. The founder-member who is now most well known is Hugh Munro, who catalogued the distinct 3000 foot mountains of Scotland, now known as “The Munros”, and “Munro Baggers” are people who focus on climbing them all. The SMC keeps a list of those who wish to record their ‘compleation’ of the Munros and, at the time of writing in 2021, approximately 6,600 people have “compleated”.

Membership
The SMC consists of experienced and competent climbers and mountaineers, both men and women, who have a commitment to climbing in Scotland. Today, there are approximately 500 members, most of whom live in Scotland but with a sizeable minority in England, the Alps and elsewhere. All are active in the mountains of Scotland, and indeed the world. Some members are at the forefront of Scottish mountaineering developments and this has been the case throughout the Club’s history. For instance, W. H. Murray was one of the preeminent mountaineers of the 1930s and his book, Mountaineering in Scotland, published in 1947, is a classic of the genre. The SMC president at the time was Percy Unna who, as a keen conservationist, raised the funds to purchase Glen Coe and other highland areas, ultimately presenting them to the National Trust for Scotland in order to safeguard them for future generations. Another well-known member was Dougal Haston who, along with Doug Scott, were the first from the UK to successfully summit Mount Everest.

Publishing
In addition to climbing, the Club also promotes the wider interests of mountaineering in Scotland. In 1962 the Club established the Scottish Mountaineering Trust (SMT), a charity, to promote and support health, education and recreation in the mountains of Scotland and elsewhere. Through the Trust and its imprint, Scottish Mountaineering Press, the Club produces and publishes the definitive Climbers' Guides to Scotland's mountains and outcrops (17 books), the authoritative guides for hill-walkers and scramblers in Scotland (12 books) and a further 12 books on the Scottish mountain environment, its history and its culture, plus an annual Journal, copies of which are free to download from the Club’s website. The enduring appeal of the Munros is evident by the fact that the Munros Guide is the bestseller.  

All profits from these publications are disbursed by the Trust as grants and by far the largest area of expenditure has been in supporting footpath repair and maintenance in the Scottish Mountains, although substantial support is also given to mountain rescue teams for equipment and facilities and mountaineering education and training, especially that aimed at young people.

Library
The Club’s library is held within the Andersonian Library at the University of Strathclyde, and includes historical and current publications by the Scottish Mountaineering Club and Scottish Mountaineering Trust, along with a vast library of books on: technical and philosophical aspects of mountaineering, climbing, skiing, hill walking and other outdoor pursuits; fiction and literature; biographies and autobiographies; travel and exploration from across the world, which includes an extensive collection of Scottish texts; history of mountaineering; antiquarian collection of 18th century Scottish travel and tour books. In addition, there is a large collection of historical images relating to early SMC members and mountaineering in Scotland.

Huts
The Club also operates five mountain huts open to members which can also be booked by members of other clubs from the UK and abroad. These huts are strategically placed near scenery in mountaineering areas in Scotland.

See also
Alpine Club
List of Munro mountains in Scotland
List of Corbetts (mountains)
List of Grahams (mountains)
List of Donald mountains in Scotland

References

External links
Scottish Mountaineering Club website
Scottish Mountaineering Trust website
Scottish Mountaineering Press website

1889 establishments in Scotland
19th century in Scotland
Climbing clubs in the United Kingdom
Climbing organizations
Mountaineering in Scotland
Organisations based in Glasgow
Climbing in Scotland
Alpine clubs